Till Death Tear Us Apart ( Chinese, 愉 此 一生; pinyin, Yu ci Yisheng ) is a Chinese web series released on February 14, 2017, by QQLive. The series was directed by Cheng Peng, written by Bi Yanwei, and starred Jiang Zi-le and Yan Zi-dong .

The series is based on the novel Love in a Blaze / A Lifetime Love by Nan Zhi and tells the story of Liu Yu-sheng, a young teacher educated in both Eastern and Western arts, who is secretly part of the Communist Party in a country divided by politics and in the midst of a civil war. Firm to his ideals, Liu Yusheng's world begins to change after meeting Zhou Yao-hua, a former classmate of the Nationalist Party, with whom he soon begins to fall in love and will make him debate between his loyalty to the party or love. The series was broadcast exclusively on Tencent Holdings' Tencent Video site. since February 14, 2017, although most of the episodes were censored by the Chinese authorities shortly after their premiere.

Argument 
China, 1944. The country is divided by a long civil war between the Communist Party and the Nationalist Party (also called the Kuomintang ). Liu Yu-sheng ( Jiang Zi-le ) is a young man from a wealthy family who, after returning from studying abroad, discovers that his inheritance has been stolen by other members of his family. To earn a living, he gets a job as a teacher in a small rural school. Courteous and idealistic, Liu Yu-sheng appears to be the perfect person; what nobody knows is that he is a communist who works secretly from the shadows. One day, he meets an old schoolmate, Zhou Yao-hua ( Yan Zi-dong), and love soon begins to emerge between the two young people. However, Zhou Yao-hua is a nationalist and like most people in the country, he hates communists. Thus begins Yu-sheng's difficult decision-making, whose loyalty will be divided between his job as an informant and his love for Zhou Yao-hua.

Cast and characters

Main role
Jiang Zi Le as Liu Yusheng
Yan Zi Dong as Zhou Yaohua
Lu Zhuo as Ah Yan
Liu Yi Chen as Liu Yishao

Support role
Chen Peng as Policeman Feng
Yang Kai Cheng as Ah Kuan
Zhou Yi as Zhou Yaomin
Zhang Yi Chang as Zhao Jiali
Jiang Shi Meng as Chang Yue'e
Hong Yue as Mu Caiyi
Karl Robert Eislen as Lu Simu (voiced by Shang Hong)
Jiang Chao as Policeman Sun
Liang Tian as Zhao Dingsheng (voiced by Shang Hong)
Shen Bao Ping as Zhou Zongfu
Qiu Dong Jiang as Policeman Han
Yang Yong as Du Bianchun
Lu Jian Wei as Old Wei
Dai Ming as Old Wu
Fu Ling Jun as Wang Ma
Li Zong Han as Second mister
Geng Zhen Xuan as Mister Qiao
Li Chun Yi as Xiao Yang
Liu Chong Mo as Secretary Li
Yang Huan as Agent Head

Production 
The series launch was announced on November 8, 2016. On November 10, a promotional trailer was released. Although the story is based on a novel, the series itself was created as a continuation of Love is More Than a Word, which was canceled in September 2016 by the Chinese authorities, leaving unfinished, unresolved plots. The main cast of the series is headed by the same actors from Love is More Than a Word, thus hinting at the idea of reincarnation of the characters.

Distribution

Censorship 
The series, like its predecessor, suffered from censorship by the authorities, which resulted in many of the episodes being shortened or romantic scenes between the characters being removed. Love is More Than a Word and Till Death Tear Us Apart were not the first gay-themed series to suffer censorship from the authorities; the popular series Addicted suffered the same fate, prompting several campaigns and complaints about the decision.

References 

Chinese web series
2017 web series debuts
Web series based on novels
Chinese LGBT-related web series